This is a list of all the United States Supreme Court cases from volume 557 of the United States Reports:

External links 

2009 in United States case law